Garnett Station Place, also known as the Southern Belting Company Building and the Toshiba Building, is a historic building on Forsyth Street in downtown Atlanta, Georgia.  It was designed by the firm of Lockwood Greene and Company and completed in 1915. In 1985 the architectural firm Stang and Newdow (now known as Stevens & Wilkinson) were retained to renovate the building into loft office space.  In August 1988 the building was added the National Register of Historic Places.

References

Industrial buildings and structures on the National Register of Historic Places in Georgia (U.S. state)
Industrial buildings completed in 1914
Buildings and structures in Atlanta
National Register of Historic Places in Atlanta